The Freak is a supervillain featured in the Spawn comic book series. Also known as Mr. Kulbiczi, he is a psychopath whose mental illness and delirium was the result of his ex-wife telling him she didn't want children. He was committed to an asylum but later built himself a mansion in the sewers.

Fictional character biography
The Freak first appeared as a background character in Spawn #33, in which he saved the Violator from drowning. 

After running away, he later reappeared, apparently being attacked by a gang of thugs. Spawn rescues him and is later convinced by The Freak to help him kill Dr DeLorean and avenge the death of his family. After doing this for him it is discovered that The Freak is in fact insane and that Spawn has been tricked into murdering The Freak's own therapist. The Freak reappears again later with a gang of street thugs who manage to overpower and apparently kill Spawn when they capture him in the Deadzone. The necroplasm he saves from Spawn's crucified body would later cause a murdered bum, Eddie Beckett, to be reborn as The Heap. Spawn's body is retrieved from the Deadzone by Sam Burke and Twitch Williams, which allows Spawn to return to life thanks to bugs and insects in the alley.

The Freak is killed when Spawn suffocates him with insects that were created when Spawn took The Freak's inner evils and gave them tangible form. Seeking to return to their place of origin they attempt to reenter The Freak, but in doing so suffocate him.

The Freak reappears in Hell in issue #100, laughing madly as Spawn confronts Malebolgia. Later, when Spawn and Cogliostro are drawn into Hell along with the Redeemer, the Freak is seen wandering through a frozen wasteland of Hell, before finally locating a mysterious box that had been given to Cogliostro by Mammon. Freak is later found by Redeemer, staring at the contents of the box, and begs Redeemer to take it from him. He describes the unseen contents as both beautiful and terrible. Freak later returns being possessed by Malebolgia for a while before downing defeated him and Freak later appears in the #289 alive again this time under Simmons's control.Issue 300 had him under downing's control but later went awol and went on a vigilante spree until joning scorched.

See also
 Spawn
 Spawn villains

References 

Spawn characters
Fictional characters from New York City
Characters created by Todd McFarlane
Image Comics male supervillains
Comics characters introduced in 1995
Fictional serial killers